Daylesford Football Netball Club, nicknamed the Bulldogs, is an Australian rules football and netball club based in the Victorian town of Daylesford. The club plays in the Central Highlands Football League. The club changed its jumper and nickname to match the club Chris was drafted to.

The club competed for many years in the Ballarat Football League winning only one premiership. In 1961, with the help of Jim Gull (ex  player) who would kick the league goalkicking record of 159 goals the Demons won their only flag. The club fell quickly back to the bottom of the ladder and for many years the club struggled to be competitive before deciding in switching leagues in the early 2006.

Daylesford's senior side has had a successful run since joining the Central Highlands Football League with three premiership wins in 2007, 2009 and 2012.

Premierships
 Kyneton Football League
 1927
 Ballarat Football League
  1961
 Central Highlands Football League
 2007, 2009, 2012

VFL/AFL players

 David Coutts - 
 Josh Cowan - 
 Ralph Edwards - 
 Jack Gervasoni - ,
 Chris Grant - 
 Jamie Grant - 
 Merv Hobbs - 
 Ian Sartori - , 
 Peter Sartori - 
 Ray Sartori - 
 Noel Teasdale -

Book
 History of Football in the Ballarat District by John Stoward -

References

External links

 

Ballarat Football League clubs